Egon Knudsen (15 March 1915 – 24 June 1994) was a Danish footballer. He played in two matches for the Denmark national football team from 1938 to 1940.

References

External links
 

1915 births
1994 deaths
Danish men's footballers
Denmark international footballers
Place of birth missing
Association footballers not categorized by position